Marcel Fernand Léon Walle (7 June 1913 – 1 May 1943) was a French racing cyclist. He rode in the 1936 Tour de France.

Personal life
Walle served in the 2nd Machine Gun Battalion of the French Army during the Second World War and died from illness contracted while a prisoner of war in Germany on 1 May 1943.

References

External links
 

1913 births
1943 deaths
French male cyclists
Place of birth missing
French military personnel killed in World War II
French Army personnel of World War II
French prisoners of war in World War II
World War II prisoners of war held by Germany